Việt Nam News is an English-language daily print newspaper with offices in Hanoi and Ho Chi Minh, published by the Vietnam News Agency, the news service of the government of Vietnam.

The newspaper was first published in 1991. It is published seven days a week and is the main English newspaper in Vietnam. 

The paper is a member of the Asia News Network.

See also
 Media of Vietnam
 Saigon Times

References

Newspapers published in Vietnam
English-language newspapers published in Asia
Publications established in 1991
1991 establishments in Vietnam
Mass media in Hanoi